Androula Sialou (born 27 January 1973) is a retired Cypriot athlete who specialised in the 400 metres hurdles. She represented her country at the 2004 Summer Olympics reaching the semifinals. She is the Cypriot national record holder for the event with her personal best of 54.76 seconds.

Competition record

Personal bests
Outdoor
400 metres – 52.30 (Kalamata 2003)
400 metres hurdles – 54.76 (Irakleio 2004) NR
Indoor
200 metres – 23.96 (Piraeus 2002) NR
400 metres – 52.91 (Peania 2004) NR

References

1973 births
Living people
Cypriot female hurdlers
Olympic athletes of Cyprus
Athletes (track and field) at the 2004 Summer Olympics
Commonwealth Games competitors for Cyprus
Athletes (track and field) at the 2006 Commonwealth Games
World Athletics Championships athletes for Cyprus
Athletes (track and field) at the 1993 Mediterranean Games
Athletes (track and field) at the 2001 Mediterranean Games
Mediterranean Games competitors for Cyprus